Secret Journey is a 2006 Italian romance-drama film directed by Roberto Andò. It won the Nastro d'Argento for Best Cinematography.

Cast 

Alessio Boni: Leo Ferri
Donatella Finocchiaro: Anna Olivieri
Valeria Solarino: Ale Ferri
Claudia Gerini: Adele
Marco Baliani: Michele 
Emir Kusturica: Harold
Roberto Herlitzka: Padre Angelo

References

External links

2006 films
Italian romantic drama films
2006 romantic drama films
Films directed by Roberto Andò
2000s Italian films